A Romance of Happy Valley is a 1919 American drama film directed by  D. W. Griffith and starring Lillian Gish. Believed lost for almost 50 years, a print was discovered in 1965 in the State Film Archives of the Soviet Union, which donated it to the Museum of Modern Art.

Plot
As described in a film magazine, the senior John L. Logan (Fawcett) and his wife (Bruce) are very religious, and are taken aback when John Jr. (Harron) announces that he plans to leave their Southern farm and go to New York City to get rich. They take him to church and pray until he accepts religion. His sweetheart Jennie Timberlake (Gish) is afraid that he will backslide, which he does when the lure of the city becomes too strong for him. He is gone seven years and returns a rich man, but is not recognized when he returns home, which is now taking in boarders. Meanwhile, his father has fallen on hard times and is trying to get money to pay the farm's mortgage, and plans to murder the stranger staying at his home, not realizing it is his son. In town, there is a bank robbery and the robber is chased to the Logan farm. The mother sees that her son has returned home, and the father's remorse ends only as the family is once more together. It is then revealed that it was the bank robber that had been shot by the father. The faithful Jennie and John Jr. end up together at the end.

Cast

Home media
A Romance of Happy Valley was released on Region 0 DVD-R by Alpha Video on July 7, 2015.

See also
 D. W. Griffith filmography
 Lillian Gish filmography

References

External links

1919 films
1919 drama films
1910s rediscovered films
Silent American drama films
American silent feature films
American black-and-white films
Articles containing video clips
Films directed by D. W. Griffith
Rediscovered American films
1910s American films